Results and statistics from Maria Sharapova's 2010 tennis season.

Yearly summary

Australian Open series 
Sharapova began her season at the Australian Open, as the 14th seed. She was knocked out in the first round by compatriot Maria Kirilenko in three sets; this marked Sharapova's worst performance at a Major tournament since she lost in the first round of the 2003 French Open, and the first time she lost a match at the tournament since her heavy defeat in the 2007 final to Serena Williams (she did not participate in 2009 due to injury).

North American season 
Rather than participate at the two Middle East Premier tournaments in Doha and Dubai, Sharapova decided to instead compete at the Cellular South Cup in Memphis, as a means of attempting to regain her confidence following her first round defeat in Australia. As the top seed in the tournament, Sharapova won the tournament without dropping a set, defeating Shenay Perry, Bethanie Mattek-Sands, Elena Baltacha, Petra Kvitová and Sofia Arvidsson on her way to capturing her 21st career title.

Sharapova's next tournament was Indian Wells. After receiving a bye in the first round, and defeating compatriot Vera Dushevina in the second, Sharapova was upset in the third round by Zheng Jie of China in three sets. Following the defeat, Sharapova then withdrew from Miami citing an elbow injury. This was the third year in a row in which Sharapova was forced to miss the North American hard-court season concluder.

Clay court season 
After a few weeks off the tour, Sharapova returned at the Madrid Open in May, but, as it was at the Australian Open earlier in the year, her tournament would be another short affair, as she fell in the first round to Lucie Šafářová. Following the early exit in Madrid, Sharapova then entered the Internationaux de Strasbourg as a wildcard entry and the top seed, where she would win her second title for the year, by defeating Kristina Barrois in the final.

Sharapova then competed at the French Open as the 11th seed. After routine straight sets victories over Ksenia Pervak and Kirsten Flipkens in the first two rounds, Sharapova lost in the third round to four-times champion Justine Henin, however, she would become the first player since Svetlana Kuznetsova in 2005 to win a set against the Belgian at the French Open. Sharapova was also the last player to be beaten by the Belgian at the tournament; Henin's victory was her 23rd (and last) consecutive match victory at the tournament.

Grass court season 
Following the French Open, Sharapova started her preparations for Wimbledon by reaching the final of the Aegon Classic in Birmingham, where she was beaten by top seed Li Na after serving seven double faults in the match.

Sharapova was seeded 16th at Wimbledon. She defeated Anastasia Pivovarova, Ioana Raluca Olaru and Barbora Záhlavová-Strýcová in the first three rounds, all in straight sets, to set up a fourth round showdown against defending champion Serena Williams, in what would be their first meeting on grass since the 2004 Wimbledon final, and thus a rematch of the same final, which Sharapova won. However, there would be no repeat this time around, as Sharapova succumbed in straight sets, despite holding several set points in the first set. This marked her fifth straight defeat to Williams since the end of 2004, and the fourth consecutive year in which she would fail to reach the quarter-finals at Wimbledon.

Following her defeat at Wimbledon, Sharapova then visited her parents' hometown of Gomel, Belarus, to meet the victims of the Chernobyl accident, which occurred when Sharapova was conceived by her parents, who escaped the city as a result.

US Open series 
After a month off the Tour, Sharapova returned to action at the Bank of the West Classic in Stanford. She defeated Zheng Jie, Olga Govortsova, Elena Dementieva and Agnieszka Radwańska en route to reaching her fourth final for the year, where she was defeated easily by emerging rival Victoria Azarenka. Sharapova then made her tournament debut at Cincinnati, where she defeated Svetlana Kuznetsova (who had just won the title in San Diego the previous week), Andrea Petkovic, Agnieszka Radwańska (for a second time in three weeks), Marion Bartoli (who had just defeated Caroline Wozniacki in the third round) and Anastasia Pavlyuchenkova (in three sets) to reach her fifth final of the year. There, she faced Kim Clijsters, the defending US Open champion. She came very close to winning the title, holding championship points in the second set before rain interrupted the match and Sharapova's momentum; this break allowed Clijsters to make a comeback and eventually win in three sets.

Sharapova's next tournament was the US Open, where she was seeded 16th. After defeating Jarmila Gajdošová, Iveta Benešová and Beatrice Capra in the first three rounds, Sharapova lost in the fourth round to top seed Caroline Wozniacki, in a match where she served nine double faults and committed 36 unforced errors. Her collective performances at the Majors in 2010 represented her worst performance at that level since 2003, the last year she failed to reach a single Major quarter-final until this year.

The victory over Capra, which preceded the loss to Wozniacki, marked Sharapova's 100th match victory at a Major tournament, and her first double bagel victory at the same level.

Asian hard court season 
Sharapova's Asian hard court swing would turn out to be short-lived one; as the defending champion in Tokyo, Sharapova lost in the first round to Kimiko Date-Krumm in three sets, and in Beijing, she fell to compatriot Elena Vesnina in the second round. This meant that she lost three of her last four matches to finish the season, and thus failed to qualify for the year-end championships for the third year in succession. She had qualified for the alternate year-ending championships, the WTA Tournament of Champions in Bali, but chose not to participate.

Sharapova finished the season ranked World No. 18, only nine rankings points behind a resurgent Ana Ivanovic; this was her lowest year-end ranking since 2003.

All matches 
This table chronicles all the matches of Sharapova in 2010, including walkovers (W/O) which the WTA does not count as wins. They are marked ND for non-decision or no decision.

Singles matches

Tournament schedule

Singles Schedule

Yearly records

Head-to-head matchups 
Ordered by percentage, number of victories to number of losses, then in alphabetical order

  Bethanie Mattek-Sands 2–0
  Agnieszka Radwańska 2–0
  Sofia Arvidsson 1–0
  Elena Baltacha 1–0
  Kristina Barrois 1–0
  Marion Bartoli 1–0
  Iveta Benešová 1–0
  Beatrice Capra 1–0
  Elena Dementieva 1–0
  Vera Dushevina 1–0
  Dia Evtimova 1–0
  Kirsten Flipkens 1–0
  Jarmila Gajdošová 1–0
  Julia Görges 1–0
  Olga Govortsova 1–0
  Sesil Karatantcheva 1–0
  Regina Kulikova 1–0
  Alla Kudryavtseva 1–0
  Svetlana Kuznetsova 1–0
  Petra Kvitová 1–0
  Anabel Medina Garrigues 1–0
  Anastasia Pavlyuchenkova 1–0
  Shenay Perry 1–0
  Ksenia Pervak 1–0
  Andrea Petkovic 1–0
  Tsvetana Pironkova 1–0
  Anastasia Pivovarova 1–0
  Ioana Raluca Olaru 1–0
  Alison Riske 1–0
  Barbora Záhlavová-Strýcová 1–0
  Zheng Jie 1–1
  Victoria Azarenka 0–1
  Kim Clijsters 0–1
  Kimiko Date-Krumm 0–1
  Justine Henin 0–1
  Maria Kirilenko 0–1
  Li Na 0–1
  Lucie Šafářová 0–1
  Elena Vesnina 0–1
  Serena Williams 0–1
  Caroline Wozniacki 0–1

Finals

Singles: 5 (2–3)

See also 
 2010 Serena Williams tennis season
 2010 WTA Tour

References

External links 

Maria Sharapova tennis seasons
Sharapova tennis season